Dillon Smit (born  in Bethal, South Africa) is a South African rugby union player for the Houston SaberCats in Major League Rugby (MLR). His regular position is scrum-half, but he can also play as a winger.

Career

Youth (Pumas)

Smit went to Hoërskool Middelburg, which is in the Pumas Rugby Union's catchment area. He represented Pumas youth teams at the Under-16 Grant Khomo Week in 2008 and at the premier high school rugby union competition in South Africa, the Under-18 Craven Week in both 2009 and 2010.

Border Bulldogs

He was named in their senior squad for the 2012 Vodacom Cup competition, but failed to make a matchday squad. In the second half of the season, he made ten appearances for the  side during the 2012 Under-21 Provincial Championship and scored four tries, which included a brace in their match against the s. His side finished bottom of Group A and had to play in a relegation play-off against the Group B winners, . Smit played the full 80 minutes as Border ran out 21–15 winners to retain their Group A status.

Smit also featured in nine matches for a  side that lost all twelve of their matches during the 2013 Under-21 Provincial Championship Group A, but he scored a crucial try in their 23–21 victory against the s in the relegation play-off.

He left the Border Bulldogs at the end of 2013, having made five appearances, all of them as a replacement.

Leopards / NWU Pukke

He kicked a conversion and a penalty in the final against , but it wasn't enough as UCT won the title in dramatic fashion, fighting back from 33–15 down with five minutes to go to achieve a 39–33 victory.

For 2014, the South African Rugby Union introduced a 2014 Currie Cup qualification competition, with the winner earning a spot in the 2014 Currie Cup Premier Division. He retained the number nine jersey for the rest of the competition, starting in all six of the matches. He also started their semi-final match against the Falcons, with the team from the East Rand running out surprise 31–24 winners to eliminate the Leopards from the competition.

He started all nine their matches and scored five tries as they matched their 2014 performance, making it all the way to the final. However, they once again finished as runners-up, this time losing 33–63 to the Bloemfontein-based . Smit's performances didn't go unnoticed and he was named in a Varsity Cup Dream Team after the competition. He played in the team's match against the South Africa Under-20 side, scoring a second-half try in a 24–31 loss for the students. He also played in the Leopards' final match of the 2015 Vodacom Cup season against  in Cape Town.

Lions

References

South African rugby union players
Living people
1992 births
People from Bethal
Rugby union scrum-halves
Rugby union wings
Border Bulldogs players
Leopards (rugby union) players
Lions (United Rugby Championship) players
Golden Lions players
Houston SaberCats players
Rugby union players from Mpumalanga